The Central Military Commission Political Work Department Song and Dance Troupe, formerly known as Chinese People's Liberation Army General Political Department Song and Dance Troupe, is the official army choir of the Central Military Commission. Founded during the Chinese Civil War, the troupe consists of a song and dance ensemble, an opera troupe, and a repertory theatre.

The Central Military Commission Political Department Song and Dance Troupe has entertained audiences both in China and throughout the world, performing a range of music including military songs, guoyue, popular music, stage play, traditional Chinese opera, xiangsheng, and sketch comedy. It is a directly reporting unit of the Political Work Department of the CMC, and is organized into:

 Symphony Orchestra, including specialized sections and instrumental ensembles
 Mixed Chorus
 Men's and Women's Choirs, including specialized sections
 Traditional Chinese symphony orchestra, occasionally combined with the symphonic orchestra
 Opera ensembles (Traditional Chinese opera and Western)
 Pop and Rock band
 Repertory Theater of the PLA

In 2016, as part of the Xi Jinping's restructuring of the PLA, many of the performance troupes under the PWD-CMC were also restructured or simply disbanded altogether.

Composition
These past and present artists and musicians worked as part of the central SDT:

 Playwrights: Dong Xiaowu, Hu Guogang, Zhu Donglin, Zhang Wenming, Jiang Huaxun, Liu Ying, Yu Zengxiang, Sun Jiabao, Zuo Qing, Zhang Jigang, Sun Yupeng, and Ma Yongmu
 Songwriters: Wei Feng, Chen Kezheng, Li Yourong, Gao Jun, Qu Cong, He Dongjiu, and Zhao Daming.
 Composers: Shi Lemeng, Meng Guibin, Yan Ke, Lu Zulong, Fu Gengchen, Xu Xiyi, Zhang Naicheng, Shi Xin, Meng Xianbin, Ding Xiaoli, Zhang Zhuoya, Wang Zujie, Guo Hongjun, Yin Qing, and Liu Qing
 Conductors: Hu Defeng, Xu Xin, Liu Yunhou, and Zheng Jian.
 Singers: Peng Liyuan, Phoenix Legend, Li Shuangjiang, Yan Weiwen, Dong Wenhua, Yu Junjian, Mao Amin, Cai Guoqing, Bai Xue, Ma Ziyu, Xu Youguang, Kou Jialun, Su Shenglan, Ke Limu, Cheng Zhi, Wang Xiufen, Xiong Qingcai, Tan Jing, Wang Hongwei, Liu Xiaona, Zhong Liyan, Zu Hai, Wang Lida, Lei Jia, Wu Na, Wang Qingshuang, Alu Azhuo, Zhao Xin, Jin Tingting, Tang Zixing, Meng Ge, Yang Hongji, Dai Yuqiang, Feng Ruili, Suolang Wangmu, Ding Xiaohong, Pang Long, Ji Minjia, Lü Jihong, Chen Hong, Sha Yi, Chen Lili, Chang Sisi, Bai Zhiyao , and Chen Sisi
 Dancers: Zhou Guixin, Shen Peiyi, Li Qingming, Liu Min, Huang Qicheng, and Qiu Hui
 Xiangsheng performer: Huang Hong, Pan Changjiang, Pan Yang, Guo Da, Liu Yajing, Niu Li, Chang Baohua, and Chang Guitian

References 

People's Liberation Army General Political Department
Musical groups established in 1953
1953 establishments in China
Military choirs